Sunday Communications Limited (branded as SUNDAY Communications) is a Cayman Islands incorporated holding company, but headquartered and listed in Hong Kong S.A.R., China. It is the parent company of a mobile network operator of Hong Kong, Mandarin Communications (do business as SUNDAY).

History
Sunday Communications Limited, was registered in Hong Kong as a foreign company in 2000; it was a listed company on the Stock Exchange of Hong Kong since March 2000. The group, via a subsidiary, Hong Kong incorporated Mandarin Communications (trading as SUNDAY), was a mobile network operator of Hong Kong; Mandarin Communications itself, was incorporated in 1994 and launched operations in 1997. It provided 2G GSM, 3G, fixed line, and IDD services.

The majority stake of Sunday Communications was acquired by PCCW, via a SPV, PCCW Mobile Holding No.2 Limited in 2005, from Distacom Communications, USI Holdings and other minority shareholders, Sunday Communications sold Mandarin Communications and other businesses to PCCW as an intra-group transaction for HK$1.9435 billion and was delisted in 2006. Mandarin Communications, was then renamed to PCCW Mobile HK in 2007; Sunday Communications, as a subsidiary of PCCW, was dissolved in 2007.

See also
 Sun Mobile, a mobile virtual network operator which was launched by HKT (a PCCW subsidiary) and Telecom Digital
 Craig Ehrlich, former Managing Director

References

External links
  

Offshore companies of the Cayman Islands
Defunct companies of Hong Kong
Defunct companies of British Overseas Territories
Holding companies of Hong Kong
Mobile phone companies of Hong Kong
Companies formerly listed on the Hong Kong Stock Exchange
Companies formerly listed on the Nasdaq
Companies established in 1999
1999 establishments in British Overseas Territories
2000 establishments in Hong Kong
Companies disestablished in 2007
2007 disestablishments in Hong Kong
2007 disestablishments in British Overseas Territories
Pacific Century Group